The 2014 Copa Libertadores de América (officially the 2014 Copa Bridgestone Libertadores for sponsorship reasons) was the 55th edition of the Copa Libertadores de América, South America's premier international club football tournament organized by CONMEBOL. Atlético Mineiro were the defending champions, but were eliminated by Atlético Nacional in the round of 16.

In the finals, Argentine team San Lorenzo defeated Paraguayan team Nacional 2–1 on aggregate to win their first title, and earned the right to play in the 2014 FIFA Club World Cup and the 2015 Recopa Sudamericana. The streak of four successive tournaments won by a Brazilian team was broken; in fact, none of the four semifinalists were from Brazil (first time since 1991, and the first finals since 2004 to not feature a Brazilian team) or had reached the final before.

Qualified teams

Draw

The draw of the tournament was held on December 12, 2013, in Luque, Paraguay.

For the first stage, the 12 teams were drawn into six ties containing a team from Pot 1 and a team from Pot 2, with the former hosting the second leg. The seeding of each team was determined by which associations reached the furthest stage in the previous Copa Libertadores.

For the second stage, the 32 teams were drawn into eight groups of four containing one team from each of the four seeding pots. The seeding of each team was determined by their association and qualifying berth (as per the rotational agreement established by CONMEBOL, the teams which qualified through berths 1 from Colombia, Ecuador, Peru and Venezuela were seeded into Pot 1 for odd-numbered years, while the teams which qualified through berths 1 from Bolivia, Chile, Paraguay and Uruguay were seeded into Pot 1 for even-numbered years). Teams from the same association in Pots 1 and 2 could not be drawn into the same group. However, a first stage winner, whose identity was not known at the time of the draw, could be drawn into the same group with another team from the same association.

Schedule
The schedule of the competition was as follows (all dates listed are Wednesdays, but matches may be played on Tuesdays and Thursdays as well). There was a two-month break between the quarterfinals and semifinals due to the 2014 FIFA World Cup.

First stage

In the first stage, each tie was played on a home-and-away two-legged basis. If tied on aggregate, the away goals rule was used. If still tied, the penalty shoot-out was used to determine the winner (no extra time was played). The winners of each tie advanced to the second stage to join the 26 automatic qualifiers.

|}

Second stage

In the second stage, each group was played on a home-and-away round-robin basis. Each team earned 3 points for a win, 1 point for a draw, and 0 points for a loss. If tied on points, the following criteria were used to determine the ranking: 1. Goal difference; 2. Goals scored; 3. Away goals scored; 4. Drawing of lots. The winners and runners-up of each group advanced to the round of 16.

Group 1

Group 2

Group 3

Group 4

Group 5

Group 6

Group 7

Group 8

Knockout stages

In the knockout stages, the 16 teams played a single-elimination tournament, with the following rules:
Each tie was played on a home-and-away two-legged basis, with the higher-seeded team hosting the second leg. However, CONMEBOL required that the second leg of the finals must be played in South America, i.e., a finalist from Mexico must host the first leg regardless of seeding.
In the round of 16, quarterfinals, and semifinals, if tied on aggregate, the away goals rule was used. If still tied, the penalty shoot-out was used to determine the winner (no extra time was played).
In the finals, if tied on aggregate, the away goals rule was not used, and 30 minutes of extra time was played. If still tied after extra time, the penalty shoot-out was used to determine the winner.
If there were two semifinalists from the same association, they must play each other.

Seeding

Bracket

Round of 16

|}

Quarterfinals

|}

Semifinals

|}

Finals

The finals were played on a home-and-away two-legged basis, with the higher-seeded team hosting the second leg. If tied on aggregate, the away goals rule was not used, and 30 minutes of extra time was played. If still tied after extra time, the penalty shoot-out was used to determine the winner.

San Lorenzo won 2–1 on aggregate.

Top goalscorers

See also
2014 FIFA Club World Cup
2014 Copa Sudamericana
2015 Recopa Sudamericana

References

External links
 
Copa Libertadores 2014, CONMEBOL.com 

 
2014
1